Zhaodong railway station is a railway station on the Binzhou Railway located in  Heilongjiang, China

Railway stations in Heilongjiang
Stations on the Harbin–Qiqihar Intercity Railway